Shukol (also Romanized as Shūkol and Shookol; also known as Shū Gol-e Ḩājjīvand and Shūkol Saragh) is a village in Abezhdan Rural District, Abezhdan District, Andika County, Khuzestan Province, Iran. At the 2006 census, its population was 786, in 134 families.

References 

Populated places in Andika County